Paracymoriza laminalis is a moth in the family Crambidae. It was described by George Hampson in 1901. It is found in the Chinese provinces of Jiangsu, Zhejiang, Fujian, Jiangxi, Hubei, Hunan, Guangdong, Guangxi, Guizhou and Shaanxi and in Taiwan.

References

Acentropinae
Moths described in 1901